Rockford is a city in Winnebago County, Illinois, United States. Located in the far northern part of the state on the banks of the Rock River, Rockford is the county seat of Winnebago County (a small portion of the city is located in Ogle County). The largest city in Illinois outside of the Chicago metropolitan area, Rockford is the fifth-largest city in the state and the 171st most populous in the United States. At the 2020 census, Rockford had a population of 148,655 with an outlying metropolitan area population of 348,360.

Settled in the mid-1830s, the position of the city on the Rock River made its location strategic for industrial development. In the second half of the 19th century, Rockford was notable for its output of heavy machinery, hardware and tools; by the twentieth century, it was the second leading center of furniture manufacturing in the nation, and 94th largest city. During the second half of the 20th century, Rockford struggled alongside many Rust Belt cities. Since the late 1990s, efforts in economic diversification have led to growth of automotive, aerospace, and healthcare industries, as well as the undertaking of various tourism and downtown revitalization efforts.

Nicknamed the Forest City, Rockford is presently known for various venues of cultural or historical significance, including Anderson Japanese Gardens, Klehm Arboretum, Rockford Art Museum, Tinker Swiss Cottage, the BMO Harris Bank Center, the Coronado Theatre, the Laurent House, and the Burpee Museum of Natural History. Its contributions to music are noted in the Mendelssohn Club, the oldest music club in the nation, and performers such as Phantom Regiment and Cheap Trick. Notable outdoor or recreational spots near Rockford are Rock Cut State Park, Atwood Homestead County Forest Preserve, and Lowden State Park.

History

Settlement and development
Rockford traces its roots to 1834, as the combined settlements of Midway were founded on both banks of the Rock River. On the west bank, Germanicus Kent and Thatcher Blake (with his slave Lewis Lemon) founded Kentville; the east bank was settled by Daniel Shaw Haight. With the location of the Rock River equidistant between Lake Michigan and the Mississippi River, the combined settlement derived the name "Midway".  In 1836, Winnebago County was created (from both Jo Daviess and LaSalle counties), with Midway named as its county seat, as it was “halfway between Galena and Chicago on a line of four-horse coaches."

In 1837, the village of Midway was renamed Rockford, highlighting a rocky river ford across the Rock River in the village.  The same year, Rockford established its first post office (with Daniel Shaw Haight as the first postmaster). In 1840, the first weekly newspaper began circulation. In 1847, Rockford Female Seminary (today Rockford University) was founded. On January 3, 1852, Rockford was officially chartered as a city; a year later, the long-running "Forest City" nickname first appeared, used by the New York Tribune. Also in 1852, the Galena and Chicago Union Railroad connected Rockford to Chicago by railroad.

At the time of its founding, many of the village's residents were transplants from the Northeastern United States and upstate New York.  Descended from English Puritans, the Midway/Rockford population was similar to much of the rest of northern Illinois and nearly all of Wisconsin during the mid-19th century. After the Black Hawk War, additional immigrants moved to northern Illinois; during the 1830s and 1840s, Rockford and Winnebago County were considered a cultural extension of New England.

During the antebellum period, Rockford shared abolitionist leanings, lending considerable support to the Free Soil Party and the later Republican Party. In 1848, 42 percent of voters in Winnebago County (where Rockford dominated as the county seat) voted for Martin Van Buren. In 1852, Free Soil candidate John P. Hale became the first presidential candidate to visit Rockford, although he would only receive 28 percent of the vote. In 1860, Abraham Lincoln won 3,985 votes in Winnebago County to the 817 votes of Stephen A. Douglas.

The 1850s brought industry that would change Rockford forever. In 1853, inventor John Henry Manny moved to Rockford to produce horse-drawn mechanical reapers for farmers and transport the finished products by rail. Chicago implement manufacturer Cyrus McCormick (whose company became International Harvester) took Manny to court after he produced nearly 6,000 machines; Manny would prevail on both judgement and an appeal. Along with the production of agricultural machines, Swedish furniture cooperatives established the city as a manufacturing base. The Rockford Union Furniture Company, under John Erlander, spearheaded these cooperatives. Today, Erlander's home is a Rockford museum that shows his efforts in elevating Rockford to second in furniture manufacturing in the nation, behind Grand Rapids.

During the Civil War, one of the first Illinois regiments to be mobilized, the Zouaves, were from Rockford. The city also served as the site for Camp Fuller, a training site for four other infantry regiments.

In 1884, Rockford established its first city-wide public school district, constructing Rockford Central High School in 1885; following the construction of the high school, the district began construction of brick multi-story multigrade school buildings across the city. 
The Rockford Female Seminary became the alma mater of Jane Addams in 1881. This move accompanied the Seminary's transition into a more complete curriculum, which was represented by its renaming to Rockford College in 1892. Culture flourished with the founding of the Mendelssohn Club in 1884, which became the oldest operating music club in the United States. This was complemented by the construction of a Carnegie library in 1902, which became the first building of Rockford's public library system. 1903 saw the dedication of the Winnebago County Veterans Memorial Hall in the presence of sitting President Theodore Roosevelt. Roosevelt returned to Rockford during his campaign in 1912 and again to address the soldiers at Camp Grant, a training site for World War I soldiers.

Twentieth century

The twentieth century saw demographic changes to Rockford. An influx of Italians, Poles, Lithuanians, and African Americans replaced the previously dominant Irish and Swedes. The city was also no stranger to contemporary political issues. Electorally divided between wets and drys on the subject of prohibition, Rockford featured a coalition of labor unionists and socialists that elected numerous aldermen and carried 25 to 40 percent in mayoral elections. During World War I, an antiwar protest by the Industrial Workers of the World led to 118 arrests. In 1920, the city was a target of the Palmer Raids. While its congressional district favored Republicans, Rockford continuously elected former Socialists as mayor between 1921 and 1955.

One of its contemporary attractions, the Coronado Theatre, opened in 1927. Noted for its atmospheric styling, the Coronado rivaled its counterparts in Chicago and was added to the National Register of Historic Places in 1979. Camp Grant was turned over to the Illinois National Guard. During World War II, it reopened as an induction center and POW detention camp. The USS Rockford, a Tacoma-class frigate named for the city, was commissioned in March 1944 and earned two service stars.

In the September 1949 issue of Life magazine, postwar Rockford was described as "nearly typical of the U.S. as any city can be." Due to this archetypal nature, sociologists like W. Lloyd Warner warned of the necessity to "understand the realities of their system."  In the late 1950s, Rockford lost over 50,000 trees to Dutch elm disease, thinning the tree canopy of the "Forest City" for decades.

From 1955 to 1965, several events would take place that would shape the development of Rockford into the 21st century.  In 1956, construction was approved for a four-lane U.S 20 bypass; along with shifting truck traffic away from the downtown routing of the highway, the bypass established much of the southern border of the city (which remains to this day).  In 1958, Interstate 90 was completed in Illinois, becoming the Northwest Tollway; in a decision that would change Rockford forever, the interstate highway was not routed through the city, but near the Winnebago-Boone county line, with the eastern terminus of the US 20 bypass in Cherry Valley.

In 1963, the Rockford area was selected by Chrysler Corporation to construct an assembly plant; the final site of what is now the Belvidere Assembly Plant is southwest of Belvidere, between US 20 and Interstate 90.  While not located directly in the city, the Chrysler assembly plant has served as one of the largest employers of the region since its 1965 opening.

The growth of Rockford led to many changes to its educational systems.  In 1955, Rockford College (now Rockford University) became co-educational for the first time.  Coinciding with the expansion of the student body, the college outgrew its near-east side campus in use since the 1840s.  Following the acquisition of land in 1957, construction began on its present-day campus location, opening in 1964.  In 1964, Rock Valley College was founded as a two-year community college, with construction on its campus commencing in 1965.

Prior to the 1960s, neighborhood and economic growth in Rockford largely mirrored itself on both sides of the Rock River.  As the 20th century progressed, growth in western Rockford (and established neighborhoods in eastern areas of the city) struggled to compete with economic development that moved further east.  From the late 1950s, downtown Rockford (centered around the intersection of IL 2 and US 20; Main Street and West State Street) began to decline as the primary shopping district of the city.  In 1956, North Towne Mall opened on the far northwest side of the city, with Colonial Village opening on the (then) far east side in 1962, both of which were partially enclosed (some stores had exterior entrances).  In 1973, Cherryvale Mall was opened as the first fully enclosed shopping mall in the city; nearly 6 miles from the city center, the mall was located at the intersection of the US-20 bypass and the Northwest Tollway, sharing a city border with Cherry Valley.

While growth at the eastern end of Rockford undersaw favorable conditions for growth, established neighborhoods began to suffer irrevocable decline.  In the 1970s, efforts commenced to revitalize downtown Rockford, once the primary shopping district.  In a highly criticized decision, the city reconfigured several blocks of downtown into a pedestrian mall, closing off the Main Street/West State Street intersection to traffic. In 1975, what the local press characterized as one of the most well-known and haunting crimes took place when newspaper delivery boy Joey Didier was kidnapped and murdered by Robert Lower. In the late 1970s, Symbol, a 47-foot tall Alexander Liberman abstract sculpture was placed in the center of the pedestrian mall. In 1980, then Congressman John B. Anderson, representing the 16th Congressional District in Illinois which includes Rockford, ran for President of the United States. To further attract commercial growth, the MetroCentre 10,000-seat multi-purpose arena, was opened in 1981.

Rockford would be hit hard by the early 1980s recession, becoming one of the highest-unemployed cities in the United States.  In 1981, rail service to the city ended as Amtrak ended the Dubuque-to-Chicago Black Hawk route.  After struggling to compete with more modern facilities, the Coronado Theatre showed its last movie in 1984, shifting solely to stage performances.  To expand passenger service, the Greater Rockford Airport rebuilt its passenger terminal in 1987, although the access of Rockford to the Northwest Tollway (to the much larger O'Hare Airport) became a popular alternative.

In a decision that continues to affect Rockford to the present day, in 1989, Rockford Public School District 205 closed several schools across the city in a cost-cutting decision.  In the aftermath of the decision, the school district was found guilty in federal court of discrimination against minority students.  From 1993 to 2001, the school district was under federal oversight to desegregate its schools, costing over $250 million.

Twenty-first century
With its economy predominately based on manufacturing, the city has been affected by the deindustrialization of the Rust Belt. There has been an emphasis on services, especially medicine and education.

During the 2000s, a movement began to reverse urban blight of downtown Rockford, which had begun in the 1960s.  Following an 18-month multi-million dollar renovation and expansion, the Coronado Theatre was reopened in 2001.  In 2008, the MetroCentre downtown arena completed a $20 million renovation (renamed the BMO Harris Bank Center in 2011).  In 2009, the downtown pedestrian mall was removed as part of a street refurbishment project, restoring Main Street (Illinois Route 2) to two-lane traffic for the first time in nearly 45 years.

Prior to the onset of the Great Recession, housing in Rockford was affected by catastrophic weather events.  In 2006 and 2007, Keith Creek underwent 100-year flooding events, damaging hundreds of older homes on the near east side of the city.  In response, the city secured FEMA grants, demolishing over 100 homes; to reduce the severity of future flooding events, the creek is being reconstructed (through 2019) and left as greenspace.  As an effect of the recession, by 2013, thirty-two percent of mortgages in the city were upside-down.  While remaining the largest city in Illinois outside Chicago and its suburbs, estimated population decline from 2010 to 2017 led Rockford to be overtaken by Joliet and Naperville (the latter, slightly), effectively making it the fifth-largest city in Illinois.

From 2014 to 2018, the unemployment rate in Rockford has fallen from 12.9 percent to 4.4 percent (the lowest since 2000).  While predominately a manufacturing community since World War II, Rockford has struggled to diversify its industrial base.  Shifting from agricultural machinery and furniture, manufacturing in the city remains dominated by fasteners, automotive suppliers (representing FCA Belvidere Assembly), and the aerospace industry (Woodward and Collins Aerospace; the latter, tracing its roots to Sundstrand Corporation).   In 2012, Woodward selected suburban Loves Park for a $200 million manufacturing campus toward its energy control and optimization systems. Boeing included Rockford in a list of five finalists to manufacture the 777X during union disputes in 2014.  In 2016, AAR Corporation opened a MRO facility at the Rockford airport with a hangar large enough to fit a Boeing 747-8.

During the 2010s, all three major health care providers in Rockford underwent major expansions of their facilities.  SwedishAmerican, in partnership with the University of Wisconsin Carbone Cancer Center, opened a $39 million Regional Cancer Center in 2013.  In 2014, MercyHealth (based in Janesville, Wisconsin) acquired Rockford Health System, the operator of Rockford Memorial Hospital.  In 2019, MercyHealth opened Javon Bea Hospital-Riverside (named after the MercyHealth CEO and its Riverside Boulevard/Interstate 90 location); its second hospital in Rockford, the $505 million complex was the largest construction project in the history of the city.

Geography
Neighboring communities that border Rockford, and are considered an integral part of the Rockford metro area, are the cities of Loves Park, Machesney Park, Belvidere, and the villages of Winnebago, Roscoe, Rockton, Poplar Grove, New Milford, and Cherry Valley.

Also of note, South Beloit, Illinois and Beloit, Wisconsin are part of this continuous urban area that stretches for approximately 30 miles along the Rock River from the Chicago Rockford International Airport north to the Southern Wisconsin Regional Airport. Rockford is approximately 85 miles west-northwest of downtown Chicago, and 70 miles south-southeast of Madison.

Waterways 

The Rock River forms the traditional center of Rockford and is its most recognizable natural feature.  One of its largest tributaries, the Kishwaukee River, joins the Rock River at the southern end of the city near the Rockford airport.  Since the 1946 closure of Camp Grant, much of the length of Kishwaukee has been redeveloped into parkland and forest preserves, effectively forming the southern border of the city.  Other waterways that feed into the Rock River include Spring Creek (northeast region), Keith Creek (east region), and Kent Creek (west region).  Of the 8 Illinois dams of the Rock River, the Fordham dam is located south of downtown.

Climate 

Due to its location in the Midwest, naturally a deciduous forest, Rockford's climate has four clearly defined seasons. Summers are usually hot and humid with the average high temperature in July (the hottest month) being . The winter months can bring bitterly cold Arctic air masses. June is Rockford's wettest month while January is the driest. During a typical year, Rockford receives  of precipitation.

Rockford and surrounding areas are prone to violent thunderstorms during March, April, May, and June. On April 21, 1967, a violent F4 tornado struck the neighboring town of Belvidere, killing twenty-four people and injuring hundreds more at Belvidere's High School. Other severe weather events, such as hail and strong winds are common in these storms. On July 5, 2003 at 04:13, a line of severe storms and their associated high winds caused widespread damage on both the east and west sides of Rockford. Approximately 70,000 people were without power, with many on the west side suffering in the heat without electricity for a week. It took months to clear the damage, but because the storm struck so early in the morning there were no injuries or fatalities. However, these sometimes violent storms bring the majority of summer rainfall.

The city is also prone to severe snowstorms in winter, and blizzards are frequent winter occurrences. On January 13, 1979 over 9 inches (23 cm) of snow fell on Rockford in just a few hours during one of the strongest blizzards in the city's history. The city averages approximately 36 inches (91.4 cm) of snowfall in a normal winter, but greater amounts are common. The snowiest winter in the history of the city was the winter of 1978–1979, when  of snow fell.

Demographics

2020 census

Note: the US Census treats Hispanic/Latino as an ethnic category. This table excludes Latinos from the racial categories and assigns them to a separate category. Hispanics/Latinos can be of any race.

2010 Census
As of the 2010 census, there were 152,871 people and 66,700 households. Rockford is in the center of its namesake metropolitan area. The racial makeup of the city was 65.1% White (58.4% Non-Hispanic white), 20.5% African American, 0.4% Native American, 2.9% Asian, 0.01% Pacific Islander, 7.5% from other races, and 3.6% from two or more races. Hispanic or Latino of any race were 15.8% of the population.

The median income for a household in the city was $55,667, and the median income for a family was $65,465. Males had a median income of $37,098 versus $25,421 for females. The per capita income for the city was $19,781. 14.0% of the population and 10.5% of families were below the poverty line. 19.6% of those under the age of 18 and 8.0% of those 65 and older were living below the poverty line.

In the late 1950s, Rockford surpassed Peoria as the second largest city in Illinois by population, holding onto that position into the 21st century. In 2003, the status was changed as it was overtaken by Aurora after the results of a special census held by the latter city (as the two cities were not counted together, a direct comparison was not possible until the national census in 2010).

Religion
Like many other Rust Belt and midwestern cities, Catholics make up Rockford's largest religious group. According to 2010 figures, 20% of Winnebago County residents are Catholic, 19% are Evangelical, 10% are Mainline Protestant and 48% belong to a non-listed faith or have no religion. The Roman Catholic Diocese of Rockford, several large evangelical and non-denominational churches, and several Lutheran and other Mainline Protestant congregations serve Rockford's Christian community. Rockford's Jewish community is served by a synagogue, the Muslim community by a mosque, the Sikhs by a temple, and its Buddhist community is served by two houses of worship.

Law and government

Since the creation of Winnebago County in 1836, Rockford has served as its county seat. Rockford is the largest Dillon's Rule municipality in Illinois, having revoked home rule in 1983. Along with a mayor (elected every four years), the Rockford City Council consists of 14 alderman (elected every 4 years), with the city divided into 14 wards.

In a fashion similar to other cities its size (or larger), local government is split into executive and legislative branches. The mayor of Rockford is chosen in a general election every four years. The Rockford City Council consists of 14 aldermen, individually elected from each ward in the city. The council, as of August 2021, consists of:

Township
In contrast to other large cities in Illinois, Rockford is within a single township. By area and population, Rockford Township is the largest township in Illinois. Operating separately from the city of Rockford, the township performs civil services for several unincorporated areas of the city, as well as for other areas of the township outside of city limits.

Economy

Largest employers
As of January 2017, the ten largest employers in Rockford, Illinois are:

Other industry

Mrs. Fisher's, also known as Mrs. Fishers Potato Chips, a regional manufacturer of potato chips founded in Rockford, is a recognized brand name of potato chips in parts of the Midwestern United States.  Since 1923, Rockford has been home to Kegel Harley-Davidson; owned by the same family since 1912, it is the oldest family-owned Harley-Davidson franchise in existence.

Transportation

Roads and highways
By highway, Rockford is linked by highway to Wisconsin (Madison, Milwaukee), Iowa (Dubuque), and many parts of Illinois. In the past 30 years, the centralized location of the region has worked to an advantage in attracting jobs in the logistics and transportation industries.

Public transportation in the city is provided by the Rockford Mass Transit District (RMTD).

Interstate 90 
Known as the Northwest Tollway before 2007, the Jane Addams Memorial Tollway links the city to Madison, Wisconsin and the northwest Chicago suburbs. From Rockford north, I-90 replaces U.S. Route 51 in Illinois. I-90 also links the city with Milwaukee, Wisconsin, as I-43 joins it 2 miles north of the state line.
Originally placed several miles east of the city, the Northwest Tollway would play a role in the rapid growth of the eastern half of Rockford in the later 20th century.
U.S. Route 20 
U.S. Route 20 travels through Rockford two different ways.  The original route is now marked as a four-lane east/west business route (State Street) that divides the city to the north and south; the eastern 3 miles of State Street were expanded to six lanes in the late 1980s and 1990s to accommodate heavier commercial traffic.  From the late 1970s to the end of the 20th century, this area played a key role in commercial development in Rockford.     
In 1965, a four-lane US 20 bypass was completed.  Not a true beltway (as it does not encircle the city), the bypass starts from Interstate 90 near Cherry Valley, concurrent with Interstate 39/US 51; forming the northern terminus of I-39, the bypass links it with I-90 (carrying it into Wisconsin).  Continuing westward, the bypass travels over Illinois 251 (the original routing of US 51) and Illinois 2 before traveling northwest, allowing it merge together with the business route (West State Street) approximately two miles west of the city limits. 
West of Rockford, US 20 (also known as the Grant Memorial Highway) provides a link to Freeport, Galena, and Dubuque, Iowa; much of the highway west of Freeport is a winding two-lane road that discourages truck traffic.  To the east, US 20 roughly parallels I-90, eventually becoming a major central thoroughfare in several Chicago suburbs.  The start of the US 20 bypass in Cherry Valley marks the end of where the two highways parallel each other in the United States.  
Interstate 39  and U.S. Route 51 
U.S. Route 51 travels through Rockford twice; the original alignment of the highway is now renamed Illinois Route 251. Entering through southeast Rockford through New Milford, Route 251 travels through the eastern half of the city among several major surface streets. As it exits Rockford, Route 251 serves as the primary north-south thoroughfare of its northern suburbs, from Loves Park to South Beloit.  
During the late 1970s and early 1980s, US 51 was replaced by the construction of Interstate 39. Directly connecting Rockford to Bloomington-Normal, I-39 has a northern terminus at the US 20 bypass and is connected to I-90, using the latter route to access I-90.
Other roads/highways
 Illinois Route 2 (South/North Main Street)
 Illinois Route 70 (Kilburn Avenue)
 Illinois Route 251 (North Second Street, Kishwaukee Street, Harrison Avenue, 11th Street)
Raoul Wallenberg Expressway (proposed, never built)

Bus
The Rockford Mass Transit District (RMTD) provides fixed-route and paratransit service, with a service area including Rockford, Loves Park, and Machesney Park. The 40 fixed route buses operate over 17 routes Monday thru Saturday, 6 night routes and 5 routes on Sundays. 

Current intercity bus providers in Rockford are Greyhound Lines and Van Galder Bus Company.

Bicycle-sharing system 
In April 2018, Rockford became included in the LimeBike bicycle-sharing network.  Using 500 commuter bicycles supplied by the company, residents rent bicycles through a mobile app, unlocking the dockless bicycles.  Distinguished by their bright green color, LimeBikes are equipped with a basket, lights, and GPS (to locate them for rental); one-speed and three-speed units are in use.  

In early 2019, LimeBike was discontinued in Rockford; the company shifted its business model away from bicycles to e-scooters.

Air

The first airport serving the Rockford area was Machesney Airport, located north of the city alongside US 51.  Opened in 1927, the airport was initially a private airport; during World War II, it was utilized by the Army Air Corps.  After the war, Machesney Airport was opened as a municipal airport.  In 1974, the location was closed, becoming the site of the Machesney Park Mall in 1980.

Following the final closure of Camp Grant in 1946, the state legislature allowed for the establishment of an airport to serve Rockford, leading to the creation of the Greater Rockford Airport Authority (GRAA).  In 1948, the GRAA received a 1500-acre portion of the Camp Grant property between US 51 and the Rock River, located between the southern border of the city and New Milford.  

From the 1950s to 1970s, the Greater Rockford Airport served as a regional airport, with small airlines offering both turboprop and jet service.  To further expand passenger service, the current passenger terminal was constructed in 1987.  Competing against easy highway access (and bus service) to O'Hare International Airport, the airport struggled for passenger service during the 1990s, leading to the loss of passenger service from 2001 to 2003.  Since 2003, the airport has restored passenger service, primarily marketing its location for leisure travelers.  Following the closure of several airlines, the location is served by Allegiant Air as its passenger carrier.  Following a 2005 upgrade, the passenger terminal was expanded in size in 2018.

During the 2000s, the airport underwent several name changes, adopting the current Chicago Rockford International Airport moniker in 2007.  Among the fastest-growing freight airports in the world, full-scale cargo operations began in 1994 as United Parcel Service (UPS) opened an air package hub at the airport next to the terminal.  Second only to Worldport in the UPS Airlines operations, the Rockford UPS hub operates on a separate 50-acre ramp (parking up to 40 aircraft at a time), accommodating up to a Boeing 747-8F.  

Next to the UPS facilities, another cargo ramp was built in 2008, intended to attract additional cargo airlines.  In 2016, the facilities were leased by ABX, intending to transfer freight from aircraft to trucks; the operations transitioned into flights for Amazon Air, who partners with ABX, ATI, and Atlas Air.  The same year, AAR Corporation opened an FBO facility on the southern end of the airport, building hangars large enough to accommodate an Airbus A380.  In 2021, cargo operations were expanded further, as the airport constructed an additional cargo-handling facility and cargo ramp, introducing service by German air cargo company Senator International, contracting 747s by Air Atlanta Icelandic.  In 2022, Korean Air Cargo introduced cargo service from Seoul to Rockford on 777-300 freighters, becoming the longest flight from the airport.

Rail

Passenger

For over four decades, the Rockford region has not been served by passenger rail.  From 1974 to 1981, Rockford was served by Amtrak via its Black Hawk route, a daily train service from Dubuque, Iowa to Union Station in Chicago with a stop in Rockford. The Black Hawk was discontinued in September 1981 as part of funding cuts to Amtrak.

During the 2000s, interest increased in relinking the Rockford and Chicago regions by rail. In 2006, the Northern Illinois Commuter Transportation Initiative proposed extending Metra train service from the western Chicago suburbs to Rockford.  While Metra service has yet to be proposed on an official level, during the early 2010s, there was design work on a planned 2015 revival of the Black Hawk route on Canadian National rails, with Rockford as the initial terminus. As part of the ongoing Illinois financial crisis, state funding for the Black Hawk revival was suspended in February 2015, putting the project on hold. The service was later funded in 2019 with the support of Governor J.B. Pritzker.

Freight
Rockford is served by several different freight railroad lines, the Union Pacific, the Canadian National, the Iowa, Chicago & Eastern (Canadian Pacific), and the Illinois Railway. The Union Pacific line from West Chicago terminates in Rockford at a small yard. 

The Canadian National line from Elgin enters from the Southeast and leaves in the Northwest. They have a small yard where they interchange with the Illinois Railway.  The Illinois Railway Rockford Line comes from the South, joins the Canadian National line, where they continue on trackage rights to the Canadian National yard.  Canadian Pacific (Iowa, Chicago, and Eastern) runs on Illinois Railway trackage rights from Davis Junction, and leaves on their own trackage to the North.  All of the railroads interchange at a yard off of Main Street. 

The complex is one of the world's largest intermodal facilities. Construction on the state-of-the-art facility was completed in 2003 in Rochelle due to the close proximity to four interstate highways (I-39, I-88, I-80, and I-90) and rail routes.

Education

Post-secondary

Along with Rockford University (a private 4-year school of just under 2000 students), the city is the home to Rock Valley College (a 10,000-student community college), Rockford Business College (re-branded as Rockford Career College in 2009), and St. Anthony College of Nursing.

In addition, it hosts several satellite branches of other schools, including Judson University (based in Elgin), Northern Illinois University (based in DeKalb), Rasmussen College, Embry–Riddle Aeronautical University as a part of their "worldwide campus", and the University of Illinois College of Medicine (based in Chicago).

Rockford University is best known for graduating Jane Addams, recipient of the Nobel Peace Prize in 1931 for her efforts to promote international peace and justice. Laura Jane Addams (1860–1935) entered what was then Rockford Female Seminary in 1877 and became the first graduate to receive a B.A. degree from the newly accredited baccalaureate institution in 1882 (the school was renamed Rockford College in 1892, and Rockford University in 2013).

Rock Valley College is a community college with several locations in the Rockford area. The main campus is the site of the Bengt Sjostrom Theatre. The former outdoor theatre now features a motorized retractable roof constructed during 2003.

Public School District 205

With approximately 27,000 students, it is the state's fourth-largest school district by enrollment. District 205 has four high schools (Auburn, East, Guilford, and Jefferson), six middle schools, and 29 elementary schools. It also operates early-childhood and alternative education centers. Beginning with the class of 2021, graduates of the Rockford Public Schools and residents within the city of Rockford with a cumulative 3.0 GPA can attend Northern Illinois University tuition free. This location-based scholarship program is a partnership between Rockford Public Schools, Northern Illinois University, Rockford Promise and the city of Rockford.

Private schools

In addition to its public school system, Rockford supports 27 sectarian and nonsectarian private schools ranging from elementary to secondary education.

Culture and tourism

Compared to Katowice by writer Leopold Tyrmand, Rockford possesses a wealth of notable architecture. The Lake-Peterson House, constructed by alderman John Lake in 1873 and preserved by Swedish industrialist Pehr August Peterson, is a notable example of Gothic Revival. Added to the National Register of Historic Places in 1980, it is used for the School of Medical Technology of the Rockford-based Swedish American Hospital.

Further Swedish influence on Rockford during the Victorian era is represented in the Erlander Home Museum, the base of the Swedish Historical Society. Swiss influence can be seen in the Tinker Swiss Cottage, which was opened as a museum under the park district in 1943 and was featured in an episode of Ghost Hunters in 2012.

Modern architectural movements, like Art Deco and Prairie School, are also integral to Rockford. Most renowned is the Coronado Theatre, a civic and entertainment center named one of 150 Great Places in Illinois by the American Institute of Architects. The theatre is known for its blend of Art Deco with Spanish Baroque Revival and has hosted numerous performers over its lifetime, including the Marx Brothers, Frank Sinatra, and Bob Dylan. The 186-foot tall Faust Hotel complements the Coronado; constructed in 1929, it endures as Rockford's tallest building, albeit as apartments for the elderly and disabled. The Laurent House, a single-story Usonian home constructed in 1952 by Frank Lloyd Wright, is the only Wright building designed for a person with disabilities. Acquired by a private foundation from its commissioners, it was renovated into a museum in 2014. The Rockford Area has two additional places named by the American Institute of Architects in the 150 Great Places, Anderson Japanese Gardens in Rockford, Illinois and Poplar Grove United Methodist Church in Poplar Grove, Illinois.

The area is often regarded as an outdoor destination. Rock Cut State Park is to the northeast of the city. Once home to various Scots, Canadians, and New Englanders, as well as a railroad line to Kenosha, the park's 3,092 acres are now utilized for camping, hiking, fishing and boating, and hunting. Anderson Japanese Gardens, modeled after the Portland Japanese Garden and landscaped by Hoichi Kurisu, is 10 acres in size and features a teahouse and guesthouse in the sukiya-zukuri style. John Anderson, the commissioner of the gardens, was presented with a commemorative silver cup by Japan for his efforts in the mutual understanding of cultures in 1992; he donated the gardens to a nonprofit organization later in 1998. Klehm Arboretum and Botanic Garden is 155 acres in size and is noted for its selection of both indigenous and foreign plant species.
   More recently, Experience Based Learning opened a zip-line attraction, as its founder (Steve Gustafson) is a Rockford native.
The park district of Rockford (Rockford Park District) is particularly active. It operates Aldeen Golf Club, which was rated the best municipal golf course in Illinois by Golf Digest and one of the top fifty golf courses in the nation that cost under $50 to play by Golf Magazine. In addition to Tinker Swiss Cottage, the park district maintains four other museums. The Burpee Museum of Natural History is home to the world's most complete juvenile Tyrannosaurus rex, Jane, as well as a Triceratops, Homer. The Discovery Center Museum, a children's museum featuring over 250 hands-on exhibits including a planetarium, is on the "12 Best Children's Museums In The U.S." list by Forbes. The Burpee Museum and the Discovery Center Museum, along with the Rockford Art Museum and the bases for Northern Public Radio, the Rockford Dance Company, and the Rockford Symphony Orchestra make up the downtown Riverfront Museum Park complex. The last museum under the park district's authority is Midway Village and Museum Center, a recreation of a Victorian-era village. The eastern riverwalk of Rockford is maintained by the park district, featuring the Nicholas Conservatory and Gardens. Located on the bank of the Rock River, the conservatory is the third-largest in the state of Illinois. Just north of the gardens is Symbol, an Alexander Liberman sculpture moved from downtown during the 1980s and now one of Rockford's most recognizable features.

Arts and culture
In 2021, Rafael Blanco (artist) painted “Thinking of you Rockford” in Rockford, Illinois. This 22-foot by 77-foot piece featured a young Black Female dreaming alongside math and science illustrations.

Notable people

Sports teams

Current
 Rockford IceHogs (ice hockey; UHL 1999–2007, AHL 2007–present)
 Rockford Rivets (baseball; NWL 2015–present)
 Rockford Rage (women's roller derby; 2006–present)
 Rockford Raptors (indoor football)

Historical
 Rockford Forest Citys (baseball, 1871)
 Rockford Peaches (women's baseball; AAGPBL, 1943–1954)
 Rockford Lightning (basketball; CBA, 1986–2005)
Rockford Aviators (baseball; Frontier League 2002–2009, Northern League 2010, Frontier League 2011–2015)
 Rockford Rampage (indoor soccer; AISL 2005–2008, NISL 2008-2010)
 Rockford Fury (basketball; PBL, 2006–2008)
Rockford Foresters (baseball; Midwest Collegiate League 2010–2013)

Rockford Peaches

From 1943 to 1954, the Rockford Peaches were an inaugural team of the All-American Girls Professional Baseball League. Playing home games at Beyer Stadium, the Peaches won league championships in 1945, 1948, 1949, and 1950; the four championships are the most of any league member.

The Rockford Peaches and the league itself were portrayed in the 1992 motion picture A League of Their Own.  However, the characters in the film are fictional; the Peaches did not compete for the 1943 league championship (as depicted in the film).  Production of the film did not feature the city of Rockford; as it had largely become abandoned and fallen into disrepair, Beyer Stadium was demolished at the beginning of the 1990s.

Surrounding communities and suburbs

Beloit, Wisconsin
Belvidere
Byron
Caledonia
Cherry Valley
Davis Junction
Freeport
Janesville, Wisconsin
Loves Park
Lindenwood
Machesney Park
Monroe Center
Mount Morris
New Millford
Winnebago
Oregon
Pecatonica
Polo
Poplar Grove
Rochelle
Roscoe
Rockton
South Beloit
Stillman Valley
Timberlane

Sister cities
Rockford's sister cities are:
 Brovary, Ukraine (1995)
Changzhou, China (1999)
Borgholm, Sweden (2002)
Cluj-Napoca, Romania (2005)
 Ferentino, Italy (2006)
 Tokmok, Kyrgyzstan (2006)
 Taszár, Hungary (2007)

Lidköping and Skaraborg County in Sweden have the Industrial Partnership Agreement with Rockford. The two regions work together with growing locally by working globally.

Media

Rockford is the 161st largest radio market in the United States. It is ranked 136th by Nielsen Media Research for the 2015-2016 television season with 170,140 television households.

The area is served by over 15 commercial radio stations, over 5 non-commercial radio stations, 2 low power FM radio stations, 5 TV stations and 1 daily newspaper.

See also

Irish Marching Society
Winnebago County War Memorial
Phantom Regiment Drum and Bugle Corps
Rockford Pro-Am Golf Tournament
Rockford Symphony Orchestra
Harlem Park amusement park and Chautauqua site 1891-1928

References

Further reading
 Hillary, Michael Lee. Religion, immigrant churches, and community in an industrializing city: Swedish Protestants in Rockford, Illinois, 1854–1925 (PhD dissertation, Columbia University; ProQuest Dissertations Publishing, 2005. 3151265).

Sutrina, Katie. "The 'Rosies' of Rockford: Working Women in Two Rockford Companies in the Depression and World War II Eras," Journal of the Illinois State Historical Society, 102 (Fall–Winter 2009), 402–28.

External links

Rockford Area Convention & Visitors Bureau

 
1834 establishments in Illinois
Cities in Illinois
Cities in Winnebago County, Illinois
County seats in Illinois
Populated places established in 1834
Rockford metropolitan area, Illinois
Majority-minority cities and towns in Winnebago County, Illinois